The siege of Caesarea by the Sassanids under Shapur I took place following their siege of the Roman city of Antioch in 260 which followed their major victory over the Romans in the Battle of Edessa.

Background
The siege took place during a Sassanid invasion of the Roman east. Caesarea during that time had a large population (about 400,000 inhabitants).

The siege
The Sassanids were unable to take the city, and took a Roman as captive and tortured him until he revealed another route they could use. The Sassanids then raided Caesarea during the night, killing every Roman soldier.

Aftermath
According to Percy Sykes, "He [Shapur] captured Caesarea Mazaca, the greatest city in Cappadocia; but probably from the lack of a standing army, again made no attempt to organize and administer, or even to retain, his conquests. He merely killed and ravaged with barbarous severity".

References

Caesarea
Caesarea
Caesarea Cappadocia
260
Caesarea Cappadocia
3rd century in Iran
260s in the Roman Empire
History of Kayseri
Caesarea Cappadocia